Christoffer Edlund  (born 3 February 1987) is a Swedish bandy player who currently plays for Villa Lidköping BK as a midfielder or forward.

Career

Club career
Edlund is a youth product of Vetlanda BK where he remained until 2008–09. 2009–10 to 2013–14 he played for Sandvikens AIK.

In 2014, Edlund joined Russian team Yenisey for one year. With Yenisey, Edlund won the Russian Championship and scored one goal in the final.

After one year with Yenisey, Edlund returned to Sandvikens AIK.

On 30 December 2022, he scored his 1 000th goal in the Swedish top division, when Villa Lidköping BK defeated IFK Vänersborg, 10–2, in an away game.

International career
Edlund has played for the Swedish U19 squad when he played during 2005–06 season.

He was part of Swedish World Champions teams of 2009, 2010, and 2017.

Honours

Country
 Sweden
 Bandy World Championship: 2009, 2010, 2017

Personal life
His father is Kent Edlund, former professional bandy player and coach, world champion (1987) and champion of Sweden (1985/1986, 1990/1991 and 1991/1992) for Vetlanda BK.

References

External links
 
 

1987 births
Living people
Swedish bandy players
Vetlanda BK players
Sandvikens AIK players
Yenisey Krasnoyarsk players
Expatriate bandy players in Russia
Sweden international bandy players
Bandy World Championship-winning players